Frederikke Skjødt Thøgersen (born 24 July 1995) is a Danish professional football player who plays as a midfielder for the Italian Serie A team Inter Milan and the Danish national team.

Club career 
Thøgersen played six seasons with Fortuna Hjørring after moving from her hometown team Thisted FC in 2013. In total she won three league titles and two cups with Hjørring.

In May 2019, Thøgersen signed a two-year contract with Serie A team Fiorentina, her first overseas club.

International career 
Thøgersen has represented Denmark at multiple youth levels, winning a bronze medal at the 2012 UEFA Women's Under-17 Championship.

Thøgersen made her senior international debut for Denmark on 5 March 2014 in as a 74th minute substitute during a 2–0 defeat to Sweden at the Algarve Cup. She has since competed at the 2016 and 2017 editions. In 2017, she was part of the Denmark squad that finished second at the UEFA Women's Championship, losing to the host nation Netherlands in the final.

Personal life 
Thøgersen has been in a relationship with Vendsyssel FF defender Søren Henriksen since January 2018.

Honours

Club 
Fortuna Hjørring

Elitedivisionen: 2013–14, 2015–16, 2017–18

Danish Cup: 2015–16, 2018–19

International 
Denmark

UEFA Women's Championship runner-up: 2017

UEFA Women's Under-17 Championship third-place: 2012

References

External links 

1995 births
Living people
Danish women's footballers
Place of birth missing (living people)
Women's association football forwards
Fortuna Hjørring players
People from Thisted
Fiorentina Women's F.C. players
Inter Milan (women) players
Danish expatriate women's footballers
Danish expatriate sportspeople in Italy
Expatriate women's footballers in Italy
Sportspeople from the North Jutland Region
Denmark women's international footballers
UEFA Women's Euro 2017 players